This is a list of butterflies and moths—species of the order Lepidoptera—found in the U.S. state of Indiana.

Butterflies

Papilionidae

 Pipevine swallowtail, Battus philenor
 Zebra swallowtail, Eurytides marcellus
 Black swallowtail, Papilio polyxenes
 Giant swallowtail, Papilio cresphontes
 Eastern tiger swallowtail, Papilio glaucus
 Spicebush swallowtail, Papilio troilus

Pieridae

Pierinae
 Checkered white, Pontia protodice
 Mustard white, Pieris napi
 West Virginia white, Pieris virginiensis
 Cabbage white, Pieris rapae
 Olympia marble, Euchloe olympia
 Falcate orangetip, Anthocharis midea

Coliadinae
 Clouded sulphur, Colias philodice
 Orange sulphur, Colias eurytheme
 Southern dogface, Zerene cesonia
 Cloudless sulphur, Phoebis sennae
 Little yellow, Eurema lisa
 Sleepy orange, Eurema nicippe
 Dainty sulphur, Nathalis iole

Lycaenidae

Miletinae
 Harvester, Feniseca tarquinius

Lycaeninae
 American copper, Lycaena phlaeas
 Bog copper, Lycaena epixanthe
 Bronze copper, Lycaena hyllus
 Dorcas copper, Lycaena dorcas
 Purplish copper, Lycaena helloides

Theclinae
 Coral hairstreak, Satyrium titus
 Acadian hairstreak, Satyrium acadica
 Edward's hairstreak, Satyrium edwardsii
 Banded hairstreak, Satyrium calanus
 Hickory hairstreak, Satyrium caryaevorum
 Striped hairstreak, Satyrium liparops
 "Northern" oak hairstreak, Satyrium favonius ontario
 Frosted elfin, Callophrys irus
 Henry's elfin, Callophrys henrici
 Eastern pine elfin, Callophrys niphon
 "Olive" juniper hairstreak, Callophrys gryneus gryneus
 White M hairstreak, Parrhasius m-album
 Gray hairstreak, Strymon melinus
 Red-banded hairstreak, Calycopis cecrops

Polyommatinae
 Eastern tailed-blue, Everes comyntas
 Spring azure, Celastrina ladon
 Summer azure, Celastrina neglecta
 Appalachian azure, Celastrina neglectamajor
 Dusky azure, Celastrina nigra
 Silvery blue, Glaucopsyche lygdamus

Riodinidae
 Northern metalmark, Calephelis borealis
 Swamp metalmark, Calephelis muticum

Nymphalidae

Libytheinae
 American snout, Libytheana carinenta

Heliconiinae
 Variegated fritillary, Euptoieta claudia
 Great spangled fritillary, Speyeria cybele
 Aphrodite fritillary, Speyeria aphrodite
 Silver-bordered fritillary, Boloria selene
 Meadow fritillary, Boloria bellona

Nymphalinae
 Gorgone checkerspot, Chlosyne gorgone
 Silvery checkerspot, Chlosyne nycteis
 Harris's checkerspot, Chlosyne harrisii
 Pearl crescent, Phyciodes tharos
 Baltimore checkerspot, Euphydryas phaeton
 Question mark, Polygonia interrogationis
 Eastern comma, Polygonia comma
 Gray comma, Polygonia progne
 Compton tortoiseshell, Nymphalis vaualbum
 Mourning cloak, Nymphalis antiopa
 Milbert's tortoiseshell, Nymphalis milberti
 American lady, Vanessa virginiensis
 Painted lady, Vanessa cardui
 Red admiral, Vanessa atalanta
 Common buckeye, Junonia coenia

Limenitidinae
 White admiral, Limenitis arthemis
 Red-spotted purple, Limenitis arthemis astyanax
 Viceroy, Limenitis archippus

Charaxinae
 Goatweed leafwing, Anaea andria

Apaturinae
 Hackberry emperor, Asterocampa celtis
 Tawny emperor, Asterocampa clyton

Satyrinae
 Southern pearly-eye, Enodia portlandia
 Northern pearly-eye, Enodia anthedon
 Creole pearly-eye, Enodia creola
 Eyed brown, Satyrodes eurydice
 Appalachian brown, Satyrodes appalachia
 Gemmed satyr, Cyllopsis gemma
 Carolina satyr, Hermeuptychia sosybius
 Mitchell's satyr, Neonympha mitchellii
 Little wood-satyr, Megisto cymela
 Common wood-nymph, Cercyonis pegala

Danainae
 Monarch, Danaus plexippus

Hesperiidae

Pyrginae
 Silver-spotted skipper, Epargyreus clarus
 Golden banded-skipper, Autochton cellus
 Hoary edge, Achalarus lyciades
 Southern cloudywing, Thorybes bathyllus
 Northern cloudywing, Thorybes pylades
 Hayhurst's scallopwing, Staphylus hayhurstii
 Dreamy duskywing, Erynnis icelus
 Sleepy duskywing, Erynnis brizo
 Juvenal's duskywing, Erynnis juvenalis
 Horace's duskywing, Erynnis horatius
 Mottled duskywing, Erynnis martialis
 Columbine duskywing, Erynnis lucilius
 Wild indigo duskywing, Erynnis baptisiae
 Persius duskywing, Erynnis persius
 Common checkered-skipper, Pyrgus communis
 Common sootywing, Pholisora catullus

Hesperiinae
 Swarthy skipper, Nastra lherminier
 Least skipper, Ancyloxypha numitor
 European skipper, Thymelicus lineola
 Fiery skipper, Hylephila phyleus
 Ottoe skipper, Hesperia ottoe
 Leonard's skipper, Hesperia leonardus
 Cobweb skipper, Hesperia metea
 Indian skipper, Hesperia sassacus
 Peck's skipper, Polites peckius
 Tawny-edged skipper, Polites themistocles
 Crossline skipper, Polites origenes
 Long dash, Polites mystic
 Northern broken dash, Wallengrenia egeremet
 Little glassywing, Pompeius verna
 Sachem, Atalopedes campestris
 Delaware skipper, Anatrytone logan
 Byssus skipper, Problema byssus
 Mulberry wing, Poanes massasoit
 Hobomok skipper, Poanes hobomok
 Zabulon skipper, Poanes zabulon
 Yehl skipper, Poanes yehl
 Broad-winged skipper, Poanes viator
 Dion skipper, Euphyes dion
 Duke's skipper, Euphyes dukesi
 Black dash, Euphyes conspicua
 Two-spotted skipper, Euphyes bimacula
 Dun skipper, Euphyes vestris
 Dusted skipper, Atrytonopsis hianna
 Pepper and salt skipper, Amblyscirtes hegon
 Lace-winged roadside-skipper, Amblyscirtes aesculapius
 Common roadside-skipper, Amblyscirtes vialis
 Bell's roadside-skipper, Amblyscirtes belli

Moths

Saturniidae

Saturniinae
Luna moth, Actias luna
Polyphemus moth, Antheraea polyphemus
Cecropia moth, Hyalophora cecropia
Promethia moth, Callosamia promethea
Tulip tree moth, Callosamia angulifera

Hemileucinae
Io moth, Automeris io
Eastern buck moth, Hemileuca maia

Ceratocampinae
Imperial moth, Eacles imperialis
Regal moth, Citheronia regalis
Pine devil, Citheronia sepulcralis
Rosy maple moth, Dryocampa rubicunda
Honey locust moth, Sphingicampa bicolor

Sphingidae

Macroglossinae
Lettered sphinx, Deidamia inscriptum
Pandora sphinx, Eumorpha pandorus
Nessus sphinx, Amphion floridensis
Abbott's sphinx, Sphecodina abbottii
Virginia creeper sphinx, Darapsa myron
Azalea sphinx, Darapsa choerilus
Hummingbird sphinx, Hemaris thysbe

Sphinginae
Hermit sphinx, Lintneria eremitus
Carolina sphinx, Manduca sexta
Elm sphinx, Ceratomia amyntor
Waved sphinx, Ceratomia undulosa

Smerinthinae
Twin spotted sphinx, Smerinthus jamaicensis
Small eyed sphinx, Paonias myops
Walnut sphinx, Amorpha juglandis

Noctuidae

Noctuinae
Golden borer, Papaipema cerina
Stalk borer, Papaipema nebris
Burdock borer, Papaipema cataphracta
Northern burdock borer, Papaipema arctivorens
Aster borer, Papaipema impecuniosa
Ash tip borer, Papaipema furcata
Large yellow underwing, Noctua pronuba

Plusiinae
Connected looper, Plusia contexta
Unspotted looper, Allagrapha aerea
Golden looper, Argyrogramma verruca
Spectacled nettle moth, Abrostola urentis

Acronictinae
Harris's three spot, Harrisimemna trisignata

Euteliidae

Euteliinae
Beautiful eutelia, Eutelia pulcherrima
Eyed paectes, Paectes oculatrix
Dark marathyssa, Marathyssa basalis
Light marathyssa, Marathyssa inficita

Erebidae

Agaristinae
Grapevine epimenis, Psychomorpha epimenis
Eight-spotted forester, Alypia octomaculata
Beautiful wood-nymph, Eudryas grata
Pearly wood-nymph, Eudryas unio

Erebinae
Mother underwing, Catocala parta
Clinton's underwing, Catocala clintonii
Sweetheart underwing, Catocala amatrix
Darling underwing, Catocala cara
Clouded underwing, Catocala nebulosa
Little lined underwing, Catocala lineella
Woody underwing, Catocala grynea
Widow underwing, Catocala vidua
Penitent underwing, Catocala piatrix
The betrothed, Catocala innubens
The bride, Catocala neogama
Youthful underwing, Catocala subnata
Ultronia underwing, Catocala ultronia
Oldwife underwing, Catocala palaeogama
Charming underwing, Catocala blandula
White underwing, Catocala relicta
Lunate zale, Zale lunata
Locust underwing, Euparthenos nubilis

Arctiinae
Virgin tiger moth, Grammia virgo
Harnessed tiger moth, Apantesis phalerata

References
Jim P. Brock and Kenn Kaufman (2003).  Butterflies of North America.  Houghton Mifflin, New York, NY.  

Butterflies
Indiana